The Post Bulletin is an American, English language newspaper and news website based in Rochester, Minnesota. Postbulletin.com provides community coverage seven days a week with a print product two days a week: Tuesday and Saturday. The Post Bulletin also publishes an e-Paper seven days a week.

History
The Post and Record was formed by various newspaper mergers conducted by Amherst Blakely beginning in 1872 when he purchased the Central Record.  He later purchased The Federal Union, creating The Record and Union.  In 1892, he purchased The Rochester Post, creating The Post and Record.  Amherst Blakely had co-founded The Rochester Post in 1859 with his brothers, but sold his interest shortly after to move to Chicago and edit The Chicago Evening Post.  The Rochester Daily Bulletin was started by Archie Gove, who sold to Allen Furlow and Gregory Gentling in 1912, who sold the publication to Glenn Withers in 1916.  The Rochester Post-Bulletin was created when The Post and Record and The Rochester Daily Bulletin merged in 1925 with Withers as owner and Clarence Blakely as business manager. The Withers family ran the paper from 1925 until Bill Boyne took over in 1979. As of 2013, the Post-Bulletin employs 150 people.

The Post Bulletin publishes a monthly magazine, Rochester Magazine, an award-winning monthly magazine, Agri-News, the largest weekly agricultural news source in the Midwest and a wide variety of weekly/monthly special sections, including 507 Magazine, covering weekly arts, entertainment and community happenings.

On May 16, 2019, it was announced that Fargo, North Dakota based Forum Communications would purchase the Post-Bulletin from the Small Newspaper Group. The sale took effect June 1, 2019.

References 

Mower County, Minnesota
Olmsted County, Minnesota
Newspapers published in Minnesota
The Small Newspaper Group